Grigat is a settlement in Kabong District, Betong Division, Sarawak, Malaysia. Neighbouring settlements include:

References

Kabong District
Populated places in Sarawak